Lifesong Live is a live CD/DVD by the contemporary Christian music band Casting Crowns, released in 2006. It included songs from their second studio release, Lifesong.

Track listing 
"Lifesong" (Mark Hall) – 5:05
"Praise You in This Storm" (Hall, Bernie Herms) – 4:46
"Love Them Like Jesus" (Hall, Herms) – 4:39
"Does Anybody Hear Her" (Hall) – 4:37
"Stained Glass Masquerade" (Hall, Nichole Nordeman) – 3:53
"Father, Spirit, Jesus" (Hall, David Hunt) – 5:08
"Set Me Free" (Bonus cut) (Hall, Herms) – 4:18

Awards 
In 2007, the album was nominated for a Dove Award for Long Form Music Video of the Year at the 38th GMA Dove Awards.

References 

Casting Crowns albums
2006 live albums
Christian live video albums